is a 1969 Japanese Seafaring film directed by Tokujirō Yamazaki. Planning took five years, and it was filmed under Director Yamazaki over a one year and two month period.

Plot
Source:
Yōji Kitami is a young man who stands at the crossroads of his life. One day, Yōji meets his childhood friend Katsuyuki Shinoda by chance and Yōji gets on a whaling boat at the recommendation of Katsuyuki.

Cast
Source:
 Tetsuya Watari as Yōji Kitami
 Hideki Takahashi as Katsuyuki Shinoda
 Masako Izumi as Mitsuko
 Masakazu Tamura as Ken Shimamura
 Tōru Yuri as Sugiyama
 Michiko Araki as Kiyo Kitami
 Noriko Honma as Tome Kitami
 Shōbun Inoue as Takei
 Akira Kubo as Kiyohara
 Kō Nishimura as Munakata
 Shoichi Kuwayama as Mankichi Toda
 Masao Shimizu as Sakaki
 Tomoo Nagai as Ogaki
 Sachiko Hidari as Takimura

References

External links
The Wild Sea at Nikkatsu

1969 films
Nikkatsu films
Japanese crime films
1960s Japanese-language films
Seafaring films
Sea adventure films
Films set on ships
1960s Japanese films